A Brand You Can Trust is the debut album from hip hop group La Coka Nostra. It was released on July 14, 2009 on Suburban Noize Records and Uncle Howie Records. The album has become a cult classic amongst fans, selling over 500,000 units and becoming certified gold after only a month, a feat rarely seen in underground hip hop.

The album took over three years to make, due to solo projects from Everlast, Slaine, and Ill Bill. It was originally set for release on September 11, 2007 alongside Ill Bill's The Hour of Reprisal album, before both were pushed back.

In late 2008 the group, with the help of former Non Phixion DJ DJ Eclipse and Cypress Hill members Sen Dog and DJ Muggs, signed with West Coast punk/hip hop label Suburban Noize Records. 

The album was recorded and mixed at DJ Lethal's studio and at the Soul Assassins Studio in Los Angeles, California, with additional mixing done in Brooklyn, New York at Ill Bill's in-home studio known as "Cult Leader Media".

"Fuck Tony Montana" first appeared on the Ill Bill mixtape Ill Bill Is The Future Vol. 2: I'm a Goon!, released on December 5, 2006. "That's Coke" was remixed for the album due to sample clearance issues of the original version, which used portions from Bobby Byrd's "I'm Not To Blame".

Track listing

Personnel 
La Coka Nostra
Everlast – performer, writing, production (4)
Ill Bill – performer, writing, production (8)
Slaine – performer (1-8, 10-15), writing (1-8, 10-15)
Danny Boy – performer (2, 10, 14), executive production, art direction, design, photography, writing (14)
DJ Lethal – writing (1-3, 5-7, 10, 11, 14, 15), production (1-3, 5-8, 10, 11, 14, 15), scratching (3, 5, 14)

Other personnel
 Sen Dog – performer (1)
 Big Left – performer (1), writing (1, 3)
 Grisha Dimant – guitars (1)
 Baby Jesus – bass guitar (2)
 Russel Ali – additional guitars (2)
 Snoop Dogg – performer (3)
 B-Real – performer (5, 15), writing (5, 15)
 Sicknature – production (5)
 Sick Jacken – performer (6, 11, 15), writing (6, 11, 15)
 Bun B – performer (9), writing (9)
 The Alchemist – writing (9), production (9)
 Cynic – writing (12), production (12)
 Q-Unique – performer (13), writing (13), production (13)
 Immortal Technique – performer (13), writing (13)
 Brad X – executive production
 Kevin Zinger – executive production
 Dez Einswell – art direction, design
 Casey Quintal – design, layout
 Mike D. – photography

Charts

Reception 
AllMusic gave four out of five stars. Andrew Kameka of HipHopDX wrote that "the album is a mostly solid effort and exactly what someone would expect from a supergroup of like-minded members known for high-energy music". Adam Kennedy of the BBC while praising some the moments of the album said "it’s a tantalising parting taste of potential capabilities, yet until they improve a customer satisfaction hit rate that barely troubles one in three tunes here". Rap Reviews gave it a seven out of ten.  Thomas Quinlan of Exclaim! said "La Coka Nostra are an interesting collection of collaborators that live up to the hype".

See also 
 House of Pain
 Non Phixion
 Special Teamz
 Limp Bizkit

References 

2009 debut albums
La Coka Nostra albums
Suburban Noize Records albums
Albums produced by DJ Lethal
Albums produced by the Alchemist (musician)